Phidiana is a genus of sea slugs, aeolid nudibranchs, marine gastropod molluscs in the family Facelinidae.

Species
Species within the genus Phidiana include:
 Phidiana adiuncta Ortea, Caballer & Moro, 2004
 Phidiana anulifera (Baba, 1949)
 Phidiana bourailli (Risbec, 1928)
 Phidiana hiltoni (O'Donoghue, 1927)
 Phidiana lascrucensis Bertsch & Ferreira, 1974
 Phidiana lottini (Lesson, 1831)
 Phidiana lynceus Bergh, 1867
 Phidiana mariadelmarae Garcia F. & Troncoso, 1999
 Phidiana militaris (Alder & Hancock, 1864)
 Phidiana milleri Rudman, 1980
 Phidiana mimica Padula, Wirtz & Schrödl, 2017
 Phidiana patagonica (d'Orbigny, 1836)
 Phidiana pegasus Willan, 1987
 Phidiana riosi Garcia & Troncoso, 2003
 Phidiana salaamica Rudman, 1980
 Phidiana semidecora (Pease, 1860)
 Phidiana unilineata (Alder & Hancock, 1864)
Species brought into synonymy
 Phidiana attenuata Couthouy, 1852: synonym of Phidiana lottini (Lesson, 1831)
 Phidiana bouraili [sic]: synonym of Phidiana bourailli (Risbec, 1928)
 Phidiana bourrailli [sic]: synonym of Phidiana bourailli (Risbec, 1928)
 Phidiana brevicauda Engel, 1925: synonym of Phidiana lynceus Bergh, 1867
 Phidiana crassicornis (Eschscholtz, 1831): synonym of Hermissenda crassicornis (Eschscholtz, 1831)
 Phidiana exigua Bergh, 1898: synonym of Phidiana lottini (Lesson, 1831)
 Phidiana indica: synonym of Caloria indica
 Phidiana longicirrha Eliot, 1906: synonym of Pruvotfolia longicirrha (Eliot, 1906) (original combination)
 Phidiana nigra MacFarland, 1966: synonym of Phidiana hiltoni (O'Donoghue, 1927)
 Phidiana pugnax Lance, 1961: synonym of Phidiana hiltoni (O'Donoghue, 1927)
 Phidiana selencae Bergh, 1879: synonym of Phidiana lynceus Bergh, 1867

References

 Gofas, S.; Le Renard, J.; Bouchet, P. (2001). Mollusca, in: Costello, M.J. et al. (Ed.) (2001). European register of marine species: a check-list of the marine species in Europe and a bibliography of guides to their identification. Collection Patrimoines Naturels, 50: pp. 180–213
 Edmunds, M. (2015). Opisthobranchiate Mollusca from Ghana: Facelinidae. Journal of Conchology. 42(2): 125-161

External links
 Gray, J. E. (1850). (text). In: Gray, M. E., Figures of molluscous animals, selected from various authors. Longman, Brown, Green and Longmans, London. Vol. 4, iv + 219 pp. (August)

Facelinidae
Taxa named by John Edward Gray